Rajnikant Shankarrao Arole was born in Supa in the Ahmednagar district of Maharashtra, India on 10 July 1934, the second child of Shankar and Leelawati Salve Arole. His parents were both schoolteachers and his father became Inspector of Schools. The Aroles raised their three sons and four daughters in the faith of the Church of England, inculcating in them Christian ethical and spiritual values that have guided Rajnikant through a lifetime of public service.

Rajnikant received the Ramon Magsaysay Award for Community Leadership in 1979.  He also received PadmaBhushan Mother Teresa Memorial National Award for Social Justice.

He died on 25 May 2011 in Pune.

Career 

1960–1962 :	Resident : ETCM Hospital, Kolar Karnataka, India
1965–1970 : Fulbright Scholar
1962–1966 :	Medical Suptd.	: FJFM Hospital, Vadala Mission District Ahmednagar, India
1966–1969 :	Residency Lutheran Hospital	Cleveland, Ohio, US
1970–present	Director : Comprehensive Rural Health Project, Jamkhed District Ahmednagar, India
1989 – onwards : Associate Professor (visiting) : Johns Hopkins School of Hygiene and Public Health, Baltimore, MD, USA
1990 – onwards : Director : Institute of Training and Research In Community Health & Population Jamkhed

Awards and honours
1966 :	Paul Harrison Award for outstanding work in Rural areas
1979 : Ramon Magsaysay Award for Community Leadership
1985 : Ph. D. for Public service, Gettysburg College, Gettysburg, PA USA
1987 : N.D. Diwan Memorial Award-Rehabilitation of the handicapped persons.
1988 : NCIH Award for service in International health
1990 : Padma Bhushan National Award for Social Service
2001 :	R. B. Hiwargaonkar Award 2000 for rural health service using Grassroots workers as Change Agents.
2003 : Diwaliben Mehta Award for Tribal Work
2004 : Dr. Babasaheb Ambedkar Dalit Mitra Award for work among backward classes.
2005 : Mother Teresa Memorial National Award for Social Justice

Positions Held 
President
1980–1990 : All India Marathi Science Congress, Pune
1978 : Voluntary Health Association of India, New Delhi, Chairman
2007 : Maharashtra State Monitory Committee for Malnutrition, Deaths in children
1992 : Organizing Committee for 6th Asian Congress for Agricultural Medicine And Rural Health
1976 : Emmanuel Hospital Association of India, New Delhi, Member
2007 : Central Council for Health and Family Welfare (Government of India)
2005 : Empowered Committee, National Rural Health Mission (NRHM), Government of India
2000 : National Commission on Population; India Chaired by Prime Minister
1991 : Senate, Poona University, Poona
1989 : Planning Board Yeswantrao Chavan open University, Nasik, Maharashtra, India
1988 : Central Council of Health and Family Welfare, Govt. of India, New Delhi (Chairman - Hon. Union Health Minister)
1988 : Standing Committee of the Central Council of Health and Family Welfare, Govt. Of India, New Delhi.
1988 : Steering Committee Health and FamiIndia, Technology Mission on water, Literacy Immunization, etc.
1988 : Maharashtra State Planning Board Govt. of Maharashtra.
1987–1990 : High Power Committee on Vocationalization of Education Govt. of Maharashtra.
1988 : District Planning and Development Committee, Ahmednagar District
1985–1993 : Executive Committee Maharashtra Institute for Development Administration
1985 : Task Force on Nutrition, Govt. of India 1983 National Population Advisory Council Govt. of India, New Delhi.
1983 : Faculty of Medicine, Senate, Pune University
1982 : Executive Committee, National Institute of Health and Family Welfare, New Delhi
1982 : Central Govt. Evaluation Team Area Development Project, DANIDA)
1981 : Advisory Panel, Family Planning Foundation of India, New Delhi
1978 : Task Force on Family Planning Indian Council of Medical Research Govt. of India, New Delhi

Papers Presented at National & International Conferences/Congresses, Workshop Seminar Attended
1972: "Community Health in Asia - Role of Health In the Development of Nations." Ecumenical Christian Conference, Bangkok
1972 : "Rural health Care" Christian Medical Commission Annual Meeting We Berlin
1974 : "Mobilizing Grass Root Response for Health Development" International
Voluntary Service Organization (U N Geneva Manila, Philippines)
1974 : "Rehabilitation of Handicapped Persons Appropriate Technology" Action
Research / UNICEF, London U.K.
1977 : "Nutrition in Rural Areas" International Union of Nutrition Scientists New Delhi
1977 : "Health Education for Rural Water Supply" IRDC WHO National Engineering and environmental Research Institute Nagpur, India
1980 : "Appropriate Technology for Basic Health Services" UNICEF - Nairobi, Kenya
1984: "Community Participation in Population Planning" OECD - Paris
1985 : "Community Participation in Primary Health Care" WONCA - London UK

Oration
1980 : Dr. Borges Memorial Oration "Health Care Myth or Reality" Tata Memorial Cancer Hospital Bombay India
1981 : Shantilal Seth Oration "Child in Village India" Indian Academy of Paediatrics Hyderabad
1986 : Smt. Sabarwal Memorial Oration "Role of Women in Nutrition and Health" Lady Irwin College, 	New Delhi
1988 : Shri R. S.Dubhashi Memorial Oration "Health for all by the year 2000", University of POONA (Pune)

References

1934 births
2011 deaths
Ramon Magsaysay Award winners
Marathi people
Recipients of the Padma Bhushan in social work
People from Ahmednagar district
Indian health activists
20th-century Indian educators
Social workers from Maharashtra
Activists from Maharashtra